Friskney Eaudyke is a settlement in the civil parish of Friskney, and the East Lindsey district of Lincolnshire, England.

 
The settlement is centred on the northwest-to-southeast Eau Dyke Road, between Low Road at the north-west and the staggered junction with Sickling Lane and Chapel Lane at the south-east. Friskney Eaudyke comprises detached and semidetached houses, farms with associated buildings, a farm produce distribution company, a balloon supply & event company, a garage services company, and Grade II listed buildings.

The listed Bridge Farmhouse, a late 18th-century two-storey red brick house, is on Low Road south from the junction with Eau Dyke Road. Over the junction and further north on Low Road is Ash Tree Farmhouse, a mid-18th to mid-19th-century gabled red brick house. At the north on Mill Lane off Low Road, and near the border with Wainfleet St Mary, is Hoyle's Windmill, of three-storeys and today converted to a storehouse by the addition of an attached building. Largely early 19th-century, it dates from 1730. At the south-west on Chapel Lane is the Grade II* listed 19th-century red brick Wesleyan Centenary Chapel, dating to 1839.

In 1871 "Ancient British" pottery, and fragments of bone were found by workmen on Eaudyke Road at the south-east of the settlement. Kelly's Directory in 1885 noted the 1871 archeological finds by workmen as they were building the infants' school at 'Eaudyke'. The directory records a schoolmistress, and the Wesleyan chapel which it said was built in 1832. The listed trades at 'Eaudyke' in the 1933 Kelly's Directory   included five farmers, a potato merchant, a saddler, a beer retailer, a shopkeeper, a grocer, a butcher, a baker, and a motor engineer.

References

External links
 
 OS map: Friskney Eaudyke

Villages in Lincolnshire
East Lindsey District